Shadow of the Past is a 1950 British crime film directed by Mario Zampi and starring Joyce Howard, Terence Morgan, and Michael Medwin. The screenplay involves a man who catches sight of a woman believed by everyone to be dead.

Cast
 Joyce Howard as Lady in Black 
 Terence Morgan as John Harding 
 Michael Medwin as Dick Stevens 
  Andrew Osborn as George Bentley 
 Wylie Watson as Caretaker 
 Marie Ney as Mrs. Bentley 
 Ella Retford as Daily Help 
 Ronald Adam as Solicitor 
 Louise Gainsborough as Susie
 Ian Fleming as Doctor

Critical reception
TV Guide gave the film two out of four stars and described it as a "modest murder mystery...Tightly paced with several highly tense sequences."

References

External links

1950 films
1950 crime films
Films directed by Mario Zampi
British crime films
British black-and-white films
1950s English-language films
1950s British films